Don't Stop the Music may refer to:

Albums 
 Don't Stop the Music (Play album) (2004)
 Don't Stop the Music (Robyn album) (2002)
 Don't Stop the Music, a 2000 album by Kojo Antwi
 Don't Stop the Music, a 1977 album by Brecker Brothers
 Don't Stop the Music, a 1988 album by Del McCoury
 Don't Stop the Music, a 1976 album by Supermax
 Don't Stop the Music, a 2007 EP by Kava Kava

Songs 
 "Don't Stop the Music" (George Jones song) (1957)
 "Don't Stop the Music" (Lionel Richie song) (2000)
 "Don't Stop the Music" (Rihanna song) (2007)
 "Don't Stop the Music" (Robyn song) (2002)
 "Don't Stop the Music" (Yarbrough and Peoples song) (1980)
 "Don't Stop the Music", a 1975 song by the Bay City Rollers from Wouldn't You Like It?
 "Don't Stop the Music", a 2004 song by DJ Kay Slay from The Streetsweeper, Vol. 2
 "Don't Stop the Music", a 2002 song by Eriko Imai
 "Don't Stop the Music", a 2012 song by Lisa Maffia
 "Don't Stop the Music", a 2004 song by Riyu Kosaka from Begin

See also
 Stop the Music (disambiguation)